Selva is a coastal comarca (county) in Catalonia, Spain.

Selva may also refer to:

People
Selva (surname)
Selva (name)

Places
Selva, Mallorca (pop. 3,055), a municipality on Mallorca in the Balearic Islands, Spain
Sëlva (aka Wolkenstein), a commune in South Tyrol, Italy
Selva dei Molini, Italian name for Mühlwald, a commune in South Tyrol, Italy
Selva di Cadore, a commune in the province of Belluno, Italy
Selva (Grigno), a frazione in the province of Trento, Italy
Selva di Progno, a commune in the province of Verona, Italy
Selva, one of the 17 Contrade of Siena in Tuscany, Italy
Selva, Argentina, a town in the Santiago del Estero Province, Argentina
Selva, Ardabil, a village in Iran
Selva, Peru, a natural preserve in Peru
Selva, Santa Fiora, a village in the province of Grosseto, Italy

Music
 "Selva", a song by Camel, first published in the 1982 album The Single Factor